Estadio Sausalito (Sausalito Stadium) is a multi-purpose stadium in Viña del Mar, Chile.

It is currently used mostly for football matches and is the home ground of CD Everton.  The stadium holds 22,360 people, was built in 1929 and completely renovated in 2015. The stadium has hosted the 1962 World Cup, two times the Copa América (1991 and 2015) and a FIFA U-17 World Cup.

The name comes from sister city Sausalito, California, who in turn renamed their main square for Viña del Mar in the 1960s.

History 

It was built during Carlos Ibáñez del Campo government in 1929.

In 1960, the stadium was practically destroyed by the Valdivia earthquake, but the rapid reconstruction financed by the municipality did that the ground was chosen as one of the venues to hold the 1962 World Cup hosting all the games of the Group C as well as one during the quarterfinals and semifinals respectively.

In 1991, Sausalito returned to international football, after appearing as one of the four venues in the Copa América of that year, alongside Santiago, Valparaíso and Concepción.

In January 2004, a new electronic scoreboard was installed in the stadium as part of the requirements for hosting the Pre-Olympic Tournament of that year.

On 19 July 2012, President of Chile Sebastián Piñera announced a reshuffle to the stadium to host the 2015 Copa América and the FIFA U-17 World Cup of the same year, which started during his government and finished few days before the Copa América during Michelle Bachelet government.

In July 2022, the venue was confirmed to host the men's football tournament at the 2023 Pan American Games.

International matches
As one of the venues for the 1962 World Cup, the Estadio Sausalito hosted eight matches including the semi-final between Czechoslovakia and Yugoslavia. It was also one of four venues to host matches during the 1991 Copa América, and it was one of the eight venues to host matches during the 2015 Copa América.

1962 FIFA World Cup

1991 Copa América

2015 Copa América

2015 FIFA U-17 World Cup

References

External links

Sausalito
1962 FIFA World Cup stadiums
Sausalito
Copa América stadiums
Multi-purpose stadiums in Chile
Everton de Viña del Mar
Sports venues completed in 1929
Venues of the 2023 Pan and Parapan American Games